This is a list of bridges and viaducts in Argentina, including those for pedestrians and vehicular traffic.

Historical and architectural interest bridges

Major road and railway bridges 

See also 

 Transport in Argentina
 List of highways in Argentina
 Rail transport in Argentina
 Geography of Argentina
 List of rivers of Argentina

Notes and references 
 Notes

 

 Others references

Further reading

External links 

 
 

Argentina
 
Bridges
Bridges